Trivolzio (Western Lombard: Trivóls) is a comune (municipality) in the Province of Pavia in the Italian region Lombardy, located about 25 km southwest of Milan and about 12 km northwest of Pavia. As of 31 December 2004, it had a population of 1,333 and an area of 3.9 km².

Trivolzio borders the following municipalities: Battuda, Bereguardo, Marcignago, Torre d'Isola, Trovo.

The physician and later friar Saint Riccardo Pampuri was born in Trivolzio.

Demographic evolution

References

Cities and towns in Lombardy